is a line of spinning-top toys originally developed by Takara, first released in Japan in July 1999, along with its debut series. Following Takara's merger with Tomy in 2006, Beyblades are now developed by Takara Tomy. Various toy companies around the world have licensed Beyblade toys for their own regions, including Hasbro in Western countries, Sonokong in Korea, and Takara Tomy for Eastern countries.

The concept is similar to Battling Tops, a board game developed by Ideal Toy Company in 1968. The toy line was introduced with an accompanying manga series of the same name in 1999. In 2002, Hasbro began to sell Beyblade toys internationally (under license from Takara) along with a coordinated country-by-country release of localized versions of the TV series. In August 2008, Takara Tomy released Metal Fight Beyblade; the first incarnation of the toy in three and a half years. The third incarnation, titled Beyblade Burst was released by Takara Tomy in April 4 2016.

Game and rules
Aside from formal play, a game with specific rules was published for the initial toyline. The formal game is played with two or more players. Each player is allowed up to three Beyblades, but may not switch parts once a match has started. Players may choose from any of the three Beyblades they have with them for any battle in a match.

In Metal Fight Beyblade, a points system was introduced. In the Beyblade Burst line of toys, Hasbro releases its own ruleset for its toyline. In general, the first player to 3 points will win a match.

Points are awarded to a player based on how their Beyblade looks because some Beyblades’ names vary depending on the region; the following uses the Hasbro terminology followed by the Takara Tomy ones.
 One point is awarded if the opponent's Beyblade stops spinning (Survivor/Spin Finish).
 One point is awarded if the opponent's Beyblade is knocked out of the stadium or falls into a pocket in the stadium (Ring Out/Over Finish/KO/Knockout Finish).
 Beginning with Beyblade Burst, two points are awarded if the opponent's top is "burst" during a battle (Burst Finish).

In the event of a draw (both Beyblades are knocked out of the ring, stop spinning simultaneously, or burst at the same time), no points are awarded to either player.

Types
Three of the main types of Beyblades have rock-paper-scissors style effectiveness, with Attack generally being weak to Defense, Defense to Stamina, and Stamina to Attack. However, due to the high variability of the custom designs, this is not a hard rule. Balance types may be strong or weak to any of the others depending on specific parts.

 Attack
 These Beyblades specialize in attacking other Beyblades. They battle fiercely and try to knock out the other Beyblade as fast as they can, but at the cost of having poor stamina. They tend to outperform Stamina-type Beyblades due to their lack of defense. Attack-type beys also have to be heavy to be able to knock others out. They usually have flat or rubber performance tips and have layers that can grip the opponent.
 Defense
 These Beyblades specialize in knocking back attacks. They tend to travel slowly and are heavier than other types, resulting in opponents being deflected. Their weight also causes them to launch slower, resulting in less stamina. They tend to wear down Attack-types but are outlasted by Stamina. They are also very thick in terms of metal and have wide ball-like performance tips.
 Stamina
 Stamina is the key to these Beyblades. They are used so they can out-spin the enemy top and win. In exchange for a lack of power, their stamina lasts longer against other Types of Beyblades, making them naturally advantageous over Defense-Types, which focus on resisting hits. They have sharp cone-shaped performance tips.
 Balance
 These Beyblades specialize in a combination of the other three types listed above, giving them no glaring strengths or weaknesses. Regardless of their strength, they combine Attack, Defense, and Stamina Types but do not excel at any of them. Some Balance Types have Attack, Defense, and Stamina Modes, and their performance tips can vary.

Bey Match
An arena called a Beystadium is sold by both brands Takara Tomy and Hasbro. It is primarily a shallow plastic bowl, but may have other features dependent on the purpose of the particular stadium.
Different stadiums were released in different markets. Brands Takara Tomy and Sonokong produce Beystadiums similar to those featured in the manga and anime adaptations, with open sections in the walls and openings on the sides to launch into. Hasbro produces stadiums with walls that are about 3.7 inches tall and pockets that count as a ring-out instead.
 
Common features of a Beystadium include a shallow impression called a cyclone/tornado ridge, which allows Attack type Beyblades to move around quickly without accidentally knocking themselves out, and cyclone/tornado’s points, which are recessed disks in the stadium floor that spin freely to add randomness to a battle. Other features may be specific to the series that the Beystadium is released in, like the rails from the Beyblade Burst Slingshock toy system, the large, almost bowl-like HyperSphere toy system, the noticeably taller Speedstorm toy system, and QuadDrive toy system, which features a Low Mode and High Mode not unlike its Takara Tomy counterpart along with a detachable, separate Armor tip on the driver, and the similar QuadStrike toy system, the Armor Tips and Stadiums of which are similar to drivers from the HyperSphere system.

Launching
A Beyblade Launcher (often referred to as a BeyLauncher) is used to launch the user's Beyblade into battle. Select launchers have different levels of power depending on the gears inside of them and the user's own launch strength. Launchers differ in size and shape, with some of them using Ripcords (long sticks of plastic with grips on the end and teeth on the sides to strike the gears that launch the user's Beyblade when pulled) and others using Strings (launchers that are built with a retractable string inside of them that launch the user's Beyblade with slightly more power when pulled). String Launchers are preferred by most players because of their launch power. Different series such as 2000/Original, Metal Fight/Fusion, and Burst launchers cannot be used with others.

Launching is often accompanied by a catchphrase. In the Takara Tomy version, this would be ; in the Hasbro version, this would be "3, 2, 1, Let it Rip!"

Original Series
The "Original Series" was the first generation of Beyblade tops. They were made entirely of plastic, with the exception of Weight Disks and some Blade Base components. These Beyblades consisted of four basic parts, the "Bit Chip," the "Attack Ring," the "Weight Disk," and the "Blade Base." It had several subsystems, such as:

 The "Magnacore" line, featuring magnetic parts to attract or repel tops from each other. Additionally, certain stadiums had points to attach magnets, which affected the movement pattern.
 The "Engine Gear" line, which was introduced with the G-series, and replaced the typical "Spin Gear" with a more advanced "Engine Gear," which affects the movement of the top during the battle.
 The "Hard/Heavy Metal System" was the last line of Beyblade toys released during the original series. It used smaller pieces made mostly of metal. However, the parts of this system cannot be used in customization with those of past systems.

Metal/Hybrid Wheel System
This system was released in 2008 in Japan under the name "Metal Fight." A sub-system, the "Hybrid Wheel System," was released in 2009 in Japan and was imported by Hasbro in 2010. The main difference of this sub-system from the earlier Metal System is the replacement of the lone die-cast Wheel with a combination of a plastic "Energy Ring/Clear Wheel" and "Metal/Fusion Wheel". This was done to prevent the breakage of launcher parts. Another system, the 4D system, was introduced in 2011, focusing on slightly more complex parts. The final system, "Zero-G," focused on "Synchrome" tops, replacing certain parts for far heavier variations.

Names of Beyblades can now be determined by their parts. For example, Storm Pegasus 105RF has a 'Pegasus' Energy Ring/Clear Wheel, 'Storm' Fusion Wheel/Metal Wheel, '105(10.5mm)' Spin Track/Track, and an 'RF (Rubber Flat)' Bottom/Performance Tip.

Burst System
These toys are designed so that the top may separate if it has sustained enough hits, which creates a "burst" due to a spring in the Performance Tip. The Burst System consists of 3 parts, the "Energy Layer," the "Forge Disc," and the "Driver/Performance Tip." For example, Victory Valkyrie B.V has the 'Victory Valkyrie' or 'V2' Energy Layer, 'Boost' Forge Disc, and a 'Variable' Driver.

Toys R Us started distributing this system in Canada in September 2016 and Hasbro started distributing the toys in the United States in January 2017.

As the longest-running Beyblade series, Burst has had considerably more subsystems than its predecessors. These are:

 The Dual Layer system,  where the layers are made of two inseparable plastic parts.
The God Layer/SwitchStrike system, where each "layer" has its own gimmick, and the introduction of the core discs: discs that can now be attached plastic parts called frames that add weight to the bey and features their own characteristics.
 Takara Tomy's Cho-Z Layer system, in which every "layer" features metal, increasing their weight.
 The SlingShock system, Hasbro's counterpart to the Cho-Z system, featuring tops with different modes, designed to climb rails when switched to SlingShock mode. All beys excluding Dread Hades and Breaker Xcalius, however, lacked the metal found in their TT counterparts. This system marked a turning point; Hasbro would start to do their own systems rather than releasing the same beys as Takara Tomy in their main line.
 The GT Layer system (GaTinko Layer System), which was released by Takara Tomy and featured customizable "layers," altering performance. Many "discs" in this system also began to have their own gimmicks.
 Hasbro's HyperSphere system, released as a counterpart to the GT system, features large, bowl-shaped "performance tips" designed to climb special HyperSphere walls and strike the other beyblades while descending.
 Takara Tomy's Superking/Sparking system, which altered the construction of the tops by introducing "chassis," replacements for "forge discs" that heavily increased weight. In addition, new launchers were released, which gave off sparks when used.
 The SpeedStorm system (Hasbro's equivalent to the Superking/Sparking system), features taller tops designed to gain speed or change direction in the SpeedStorm BeyStadiums.
 The Dynamite Battle Layer system, once again features customizable "layers," this time with both a "high" and "low" mode, intended to shift the top's center of gravity. High mode is more aggressive and is easier to knock over. Low mode is more balanced and has more stamina.
The QuadDrive system was released from Hasbro in replacement from the Dynamite Battle layer system. These layers have plastic weights, instead of the metal armours, that allow the beyblade to switch from "Core" and "Apex mode". Their drivers also feature additional pieces (called Armour Tips) that increase the height and variation of how the beyblade moves along the stadium. A new Stadium was also released that features levels of playing fields that alternate the bey’s path.
The BU system would be the most current iteration which features the same concept as the Beyblade Burst DB system but is a different line of beyblades that are call backs to previous fan favorites which never got an upgrade like Chain Kerbeus or Xiphoid Xcalibur. These Beys do not get an anime season release but can be assumed to be used by their original users from the God Series.
Just like the BU System, the QuadStrike system is supposed to be an upgrade from the QuadDrive system, however, the armour tips now are large and bowl-like, similar to the HyperSphere drivers.

See also
 Battling Tops
 Spinja
 Lego Ninjago
 Spin Fighters
 Battle Strikers

Notes

External links

 
Hasbro products
2000s toys
Tops
Products introduced in 2000
2000s fads and trends
NewBoy